Clutch of Constables is a detective novel by Ngaio Marsh; it is the twenty-fifth novel to feature Roderick Alleyn, and was first published in 1968.  The plot concerns art forgery, and takes place on a cruise on a fictional river in the Norfolk Broads; the "Constable" referred to in the title is John Constable, whose works are mentioned by several characters.

Plot summary
The novel is structured around a training course Marsh's series detective, Roderick Alleyn of Scotland Yard, is giving to trainee police detectives, with specific reference to his successful identification and capture of the international fraudster, crook and killer 'The Jampot' also known as Foljambe. Meanwhile, Alleyn's celebrity painter wife Agatha Troy has just successfully launched her latest exhibition and, on a whim, takes a canal cruise on the MV Zodiac through 'Constable' country (East Anglia, as in John Constable RA, the old master, not the punning PC constable of the book's title). Her fellow passengers are, of course, the usual assorted bunch of suspects, when the inevitable murder takes place of Hazel Rickerby-Carrick, a needy, tiresome spinster whose diary is her "self-propelling journal" and who indiscreetly boasts of carrying around her neck a fabulous Fabergé, jewelled zodiac ornament, which is, of course missing. The passengers, a typical Marsh cast if suspects, include: a literary lepidopterist clearly much smitten by Troy, a pair of gushing American tourists in search of antiques, a sporting Australian clergyman, a London slum landlord with a talent for fine graphics and, finally, a grandly exotic and distinguished surgeon of Afro-European origin, to whom Troy is greatly attracted, and who is the subject of overt racism from several of the passengers. This last character belongs in a series of the author's sympathetically portrayed, grandly classy victims of racism in her novels (cf 'Vintage Murder', 'Colour Scheme', 'Black As He's Painted' and her final novel 'Light Thickens') and it's interesting how often Marsh makes Alleyn or Troy strongly attracted to them. The plot develops around a conspiracy to plant fake Constable paintings in the international art market, and, Alleyn arrives hot-foot to protect his wife, solve the crime, unmask and arrest 'The Jampot'

Roderick Alleyn novels
1968 British novels
Novels set in Norfolk
Collins Crime Club books
British detective novels